William Douglas (1769?–1819) was the Archdeacon of Wilts from 1799  until 1804.

He was the son of John Douglas and his wife Elizabeth, daughter of Henry Brudenell Rooke, and was educated at Christ Church, Oxford. He was Precentor of Salisbury Cathedral from 1804 and Prebendary of Westminster from 1807.
He died on 19 March  1819, aged 50.

References

Alumni of Christ Church, Oxford
Archdeacons of Wilts
Fellows of the Royal Society
1769 births
1819 deaths